Akan is a Turkish surname. Notable people with the surname include:

 Mahmut Akan (born 1994), Turkish footballer
 Metin Akan (born 1983), Turkish footballer
 Tarık Akan (1949–2016), Turkish actor and producer

See also
Akar

Turkish-language surnames